This championship had three groups organized with geographical criteria for the last time. The round-robin system should be restored in 1948.

Teams
Six clubs had been promoted from the three Serie C leagues, while Brescia and Venezia had been relegated from Serie A, and US Cagliari was restored after 7 years following the end of the American occupation of Sardinia.

Events
11 out of 18 clubs per group should be relegated to restore the national round-robin tournament.

Group A

Final classification

Results

Relegation tie-breaker
Played in Melzo:

Crema relegated to Serie C.

Group B

Final classification

Results

Relegation tie-breaker

A.C. Prato relegated to Serie C.

Group C

Final classification

Results

References and sourcesAlmanacco Illustrato del Calcio - La Storia 1898-2004'', Panini Edizioni, Modena, September 2005

Serie B seasons
2
Italy